The Otto Celera 500L is a business and utility light aircraft developed by American startup, Otto Aviation.

By August 2020, 31 test flights had been flown, as introduction is targeted for 2023–2025.

It has a single RED A03 diesel piston engine in a pusher configuration and can seat six passengers.

History  
Otto Aviation Group, LLC was established in 2008 by Bill Otto to develop the Celera 500L.
William Otto has been a research scientist at Los Alamos Scientific Labs, systems engineer then chief scientist at North American Aviation.
Otto Aviation is privately funded since 2008 and is seeking a Series B fundraising round: 200 million dollars are needed for FAR Part 23 certification in three years. Construction of the airplane commenced in 2015.

The aerodynamic prototype made its maiden flight in January 2018, and began performance testing in September 2019. Otto publicly announced the aircraft and its development program in August 2020, and noted that 31 test flights had been flown to date. By then, a weight-optimized conforming prototype with cabin windows and longer landing gear was expected to fly within 18 months. 
FAA certification and deliveries are targeted for 2023–2025. By March 2021, the prototype had achieved over 35 hours of flight tests, interrupted by the pandemic until Q3 2021, before two additional flying prototypes join the program.

By October 2021, the company had raised more than $50 million.

In 2022, Otto announced a partnership with ZeroAvia to build a hydrogen-powered version of its aircraft.

Design 
The 500L is a mid wing monoplane with a single five blade propeller in a pusher configuration. This results in no aerodynamic interference from the propeller, which is as far back as it can be. Laminar flow is used for its wings, fuselage, and empennage.

Otto wants to compete with light business aircraft like the Cessna Citation CJ3+ jet or the Beechcraft King Air 350. The better fuel economy should lead to a low operating cost of $328 hourly.
It is expected to sell for $4.5-5 million, comparable with the HondaJet but with one third its operating cost.

Twin-stage turbocharging should enable a  cruise altitude, where full laminar flow can be achieved for an estimated 59% lower drag than competitors. The single RED A03 turbocharged V12 four-stroke aircraft diesel engine of  can operate as two six-cylinder engines to provide redundancy. Otto targets a  balanced field length and a fuel economy of 16–22 nmi/USgal of Jet fuel. The flight controls are mechanically linked and it will be equipped with instrument flight rules avionics for single-pilot operations.

External analysis 

The propeller tips would have transonic wave drag and would operate in a disturbed wake, limiting propeller efficiency, and laminar flow would be difficult to maintain for a large part of the fuselage with windows and panel seams.

The configuration is similar to the 1948 Planet Satellite, or the 2011 EADS Voltaire electric aircraft concept. The claimed 59% drag reduction "would be quite a hard task to achieve", while lift-induced drag would not be reduced by laminar flow. A 1:22 glide ratio like current airliners can be reached with its high wing aspect ratio, without a sensational drag reduction: better than other general aviation designs, but lower than most gliders. The  max speed is achievable, but the cruise speed has to be lower to reach the  range. The fuel efficiency is difficult to compare with no specified payload, cruise speed and altitude. Pushing the laminar flow to the limit could hinder handling qualities or structural efficiency, and laminar flow tends to be unreliable in service, as it is highly susceptible to degradation from surface irregularities.

Specifications
The following data is estimated by the manufacturer in a pre production stage.

See also

References

Further reading
 
 
 
 
 

Single-engined pusher aircraft
Aircraft first flown in 2018
Mid-wing aircraft
2010s United States business aircraft